The 2022 FINA Marathon Swim World Series began on 28 May 2022 in Setúbal, Portugal for the first leg and ended in Eilat, Israel on 12 November 2022 for the fifth and final leg. It was the 16th edition of the FINA-sanctioned series. The 4×1500 metre mixed relay event was brought back after its debut at the final leg of the 2021 FINA Marathon Swim World Series and as part of the Abu Dhabi Aquatics Festival.

Officials and athletes from Russia and Belarus were banned from the entirety of the World Series due to the 2022 Russia invasion of Ukraine.

Calendar
The calendar for the 2022 World Series, was scheduled by FINA to include five legs.

 For leg 1, men and women raced the 10 kilometre course at the same time on 28 May, with a staggered start of men starting approximately ten minutes before the women.

Points and standings
At each stop of the World Series, the top ten finishers in the 10 kilometre events earned points for the place finish, overall standings and winners were determined by the total number of points each athlete has earned across all stops.

Men

Women

Points and prize money breakdown
Points and prize money for each leg and prize money for overall place were broken down as follows:

Medal summary

Men 10 km

Women 10 km

Mixed 4×1500 m relay

Medal table

Participating nations
Athletes from the following countries participated at the World Series.

  (4)
  (19)
  (1)
  (2)
  (1)
  (8)
  (8)
  (2)
  (1)
  (4)
  (2)
  (17)
  (9)
  (2)
  (4)
  (4)
  (13)
  (6)
  (15)
  (7)
  (2)
  (1)
  (5)
  (1)
  (1)
  (1)
  (5)
  (1)
  (1)
  (1)
  (8)
  (1)
  (3)
  (1)
  (12)
  (1)

National Swimming Federation withdrawals
On 23 March 2022, FINA announced that for the remaining duration of the 2022 year, the Russian Swimming Federation had withdrawn its athletes from all FINA events, which included the Marathon Swim World Series. On 21 April 2022, FINA banned all Belarusian and Russian athletes and officials from all FINA events through the end of 2022, including the World Series, attributing the intentional exclusion of these countries to the 2022 Russia invasion of Ukraine.

References

External links
 Official website

FINA Marathon Swim World Series
2022 in swimming
Sports events affected by the 2022 Russian invasion of Ukraine